Cyperus floribundus is a species of sedge that is native to southern parts of North America.

See also 
 List of Cyperus species

References 

floribundus
Plants described in 1936
Flora of Texas
Flora of Mexico
Taxa named by Georg Kükenthal